Jennifer Joy Philbin (born August 30, 1974) is an American producer and screenwriter, best known for her work on the drama series The O.C. She is the daughter of television stars Regis and Joy Philbin.

Career 
Philbin's career began soon after she graduated from the University of Notre Dame in 1996 when she became a writer for Mad TV, and then joined the script department of Saturday Night Live until 1999. In 2002, she moved on to That Was Then, an ABC drama series, as a writer, and in 2003 began work on the comedy-drama series Dead Like Me, for which she served as both writer and script supervisor for several episodes. She had a meeting with the executive producers of The O.C. in late 2003 and was keen for a job, but another job came up and so she worked shortly as story editor for the sitcom Coupling. In 2004, she joined the O.C. crew after Coupling was canceled and The O.C.'s producers offered her a writing position. For 2004, she served as story editor, but was promoted to executive story editor for the remainder of the show's duration, from 2005 to 2007, and during that time wrote twelve episodes and co-produced another four. Following The O.C.'s end, she became a co-executive producer and writer on the first season of the science fiction drama Heroes.

In 2011, Philbin became a Consulting Producer on the TV series New Girl. Between 2018 and 2020 she was also co-creator and executive producer of the ABC sitcom Single Parents.

Awards 
Philbin and the other Saturday Night Live writers were nominated for a Writers Guild of America Award in 2000 in the category of "Comedy/Variety Series".

Personal life 
Philbin was born in New York City to Regis Philbin and Joy Philbin. She attended The Loomis-Chaffee School in Windsor, CT, where she was a boarding student, and the University of Notre Dame in South Bend, Indiana. She says that, growing up, she always wanted to be a writer of some sort, but she particularly enjoyed writing scripts for amateur short films she made with her friends. While working on Saturday Night Live in January 1998, she met The Office writer Michael Schur, who had also been hired  to write for the show. The couple married in October 2005 in New York.  Their son was born in February 2008 and daughter born in July 2010.

References

External links 
 

1974 births
Television producers from New York City
American television writers
Living people
People from the Upper East Side
University of Notre Dame alumni
American women television writers
Screenwriters from New York (state)
American women television producers
Disney people
Walt Disney Animation Studios people
American Broadcasting Company people
American Broadcasting Company executives
American people of Albanian descent
American people of Arbëreshë descent
American people of Irish descent
21st-century American women